C/2013 V5 (Oukaimeden) is a retrograde Oort cloud comet discovered on 12 November 2013 by Oukaimeden Observatory at an apparent magnitude of 19.4 using a  reflecting telescope.

From 5 May 2014 until 18 July 2014 it had an elongation less than 30 degrees from the Sun. By late August 2014 it had brighten to apparent magnitude 8 making it a small telescope and high-end binoculars target for experienced observers. It crossed the celestial equator on 30 August 2014 becoming a southern hemisphere object. On 16 September 2014 the comet passed  from Earth. The comet peaked around magnitude 6.2 in mid-September 2014 but only had an elongation of about 35 degrees from the Sun. On 20 September 2014 the comet was visible in STEREO HI-1B.

C/2013 V5 is dynamically new. It came from the Oort cloud with a loosely bound chaotic orbit that was easily perturbed by galactic tides and passing stars. Before entering the planetary region (epoch 1950), C/2013 V5 had an orbital period of several million years. After leaving the planetary region (epoch 2050), it will have an orbital period of about 6000 years.

The infrared spectroscopy of the comet revealed that most of its volatile ices, with the exception of ammonia are depleted. Spectrography also revealed that the relative abundance of ethane and methanol increased in the start of September 2014, suggesting that the ices that comprise the comet are heterogenous.

Notes

References

External links 
Activity level and perihelion distance (Bortle survival limit Jakub Cerny 11 August 2014)
C/2013 V5 Oukaimeden wide-field (Damian Peach 31 August 2014)
C/2013 V5 map for Aug 21 – Sept 5 
Did we catch disintegration of comet Oukaimeden? (FRAM)
(C/2013 V5 magnitude)

20131112
20140916
20131112
20140928
Oort cloud